Bartąg  is a village in the administrative district of Gmina Stawiguda, within Olsztyn County, Warmian-Masurian Voivodeship, in northern Poland. It is located in Warmia.

The village has a population of 858.

Historic architecture of Bartąg includes the Saint John the Evangelist church, the rectory, several Warmian wayside shrines and two Catholic cemeteries dating back to the 19th-century.

Gallery

References

Villages in Olsztyn County